Mihovil Nakić-Vojnović (born 31 July 1955) is a Croatian former professional basketball player.

Club career
Nakić spent most of his club career in Cibona, which he helped win back-to-back EuroLeague titles in 1985 and 1986, as well as the Saporta Cup in 1987, always supporting his great teammate, Dražen Petrović. He also won the 1982 Saporta Cup with Cibona. He was nominated for the EuroLeague's 50 Greatest Contributors list in 2008.

Yugoslavia national team
With the senior Yugoslav national basketball team, Nakić won the gold medal at the 1980 Summer Olympic Games, and the bronze medal at the 1984 Summer Olympic games. He also was a part of the Yugoslavian national team that won the bronze medal at the 1979 EuroBasket.

Post-playing career
After his playing career, Nakić served as Cibona's sports director.

External links 

Fiba.com profile - Mihovil Nakic
EuroLeague's 50 Greatest Contributors Nominees

1955 births
Living people
Competitors at the 1979 Mediterranean Games
Competitors at the 1983 Mediterranean Games
Basketball players at the 1980 Summer Olympics
Basketball players at the 1984 Summer Olympics
Croatian men's basketball players
KK Cibona players
Medalists at the 1984 Summer Olympics
Medalists at the 1980 Summer Olympics
Mediterranean Games gold medalists for Yugoslavia
Mediterranean Games silver medalists for Yugoslavia
Olympic basketball players of Yugoslavia
Olympic bronze medalists for Yugoslavia
Olympic gold medalists for Yugoslavia
Olympic medalists in basketball
Sportspeople from Drniš
Small forwards
Yugoslav men's basketball players
KK Cibona coaches
KK Zrinjevac players
Mediterranean Games medalists in basketball
Universiade medalists in basketball
Universiade silver medalists for Yugoslavia
Medalists at the 1979 Summer Universiade